The 2013 Big 12 Conference women's basketball tournament, known for sponsorship reasons as the 2013 Phillips 66 Big 12 Women's Basketball Championship, was the 2013 edition of the Big 12 Conference's championship tournament.  The tournament was held at the American Airlines Center in Dallas from March 5–8, 2013.  The quarterfinals, semifinals, and finals were televised on Fox Sports Net. The championship game was held on March 11, 2013.

Seeding

Schedule

Bracket

All times Central
* – Denotes overtime

All-Tournament team
Most Outstanding Player – Brittney Griner, Baylor

See also
2013 Big 12 Conference men's basketball tournament
2013 NCAA Women's Division I Basketball Tournament
2012–13 NCAA Division I women's basketball rankings

References

Big 12
Big 12 Conference women's basketball tournament
Basketball in the Dallas–Fort Worth metroplex
Tournament
Big 12 Conference women's basketball tournament
Big 12 Conference women's basketball tournament